Snooker world rankings 1987/1988: The professional world rankings for the top 64 snooker players in the 1987–88 season are listed below.

References

1987
Rankings 1988
Rankings 1987